The Atari 5200 SuperSystem or simply Atari 5200 is a home video game console introduced in 1982 by Atari, Inc. as a higher-end complement for the popular Atari Video Computer System. The VCS was renamed to the Atari 2600 at the time of the 5200's launch. Created to compete with Mattel's Intellivision, the 5200 wound up a direct competitor of ColecoVision shortly after its release. While the Coleco system shipped with the first home version of Nintendo's Donkey Kong, the 5200 included the 1978 arcade game Super Breakout which had already appeared on the Atari 8-bit family and Atari VCS in 1979 and 1981 respectively.

The CPU and the graphics and sound hardware are almost identical to that of the Atari 8-bit computers, although software is not directly compatible between the two systems. The 5200's controllers have an analog joystick and a numeric keypad along with start, pause, and reset buttons. The 360-degree non-centering joystick was touted as offering more control than the eight-way Atari CX40 joystick of the 2600, but was a focal point for criticism.

On May 21, 1984, during a press conference at which the Atari 7800 was introduced, company executives revealed that the 5200 had been discontinued after just two years on the market. Total sales of the 5200 were reportedly in excess of 1 million units, far short of its predecessor's sales of over 30 million.

Hardware

Much of the technology in the Atari 8-bit family of home computer was originally developed as a second-generation games console intended to replace the Atari Video Computer System console. However, as the system was reaching completion, the personal computer revolution was starting with the release of machines like the Commodore PET, TRS-80, and Apple II. These machines had less advanced hardware than the new Atari technology, but sold for much higher prices with associated higher profit margins. Atari's management decided to enter this market, and the technology was repackaged into the Atari 400 and 800. The chipset used in these machines was created with the mindset that the VCS would likely be obsolete by 1980.

Atari later decided to re-enter the games market with a design that closely matched their original 1978 specifications. In its prototype stage, the Atari 5200 was originally called the "Atari Video System X – Advanced Video Computer System", and was codenamed "Pam" after a female employee at Atari, Inc. It is also rumored that PAM actually stood for "Personal Arcade Machine", as the majority of games for the system ended up being arcade conversions. Actual working Atari Video System X machines, whose hardware is 100% identical to the Atari 5200 do exist, but are extremely rare.

The initial 1982 release of the system featured four controller ports, where nearly all other systems of the day had only one or two ports. The 5200 also featured a new style of controller with an analog joystick, numeric keypad, two fire buttons on each side of the controller and game function keys for Start, Pause, and Reset. The 5200 also featured the innovation of the first automatic TV switchbox, allowing it to automatically switch from regular TV viewing to the game system signal when the system was activated. Previous RF adapters required the user to slide a switch on the adapter by hand. The RF box was also where the power supply connected in a unique dual power/television signal setup similar to the RCA Studio II's. A single cable coming out of the 5200 plugged into the switch box and carried both electricity and the television signal.

The 1983 revision of the Atari 5200 has two controller ports instead of four, and a change back to the more conventional separate power supply and standard non-autoswitching RF switch. It also has changes in the cartridge port address lines to allow for the Atari 2600 adapter released that year. While the adapter was only made to work on the two-port version, modifications can be made to the four-port to make it line-compatible. In fact, towards the end of the four-port model's production run, there were a limited number of consoles produced which included these modifications. These consoles can be identified by an asterisk in their serial numbers.

At one point following the 5200's release, Atari planned a smaller, cost-reduced version of the Atari 5200, which removed the controller storage bin. Code-named the "Atari 5100" (a.k.a. "Atari 5200 Jr."), only a few fully working prototype 5100s were made before the project was canceled.

Controllers

The controller prototypes used in the electrical development lab employed a yoke-and-gimbal mechanism that came from an RC airplane controller kit. The design of the analog joystick, which used a weak rubber boot rather than springs to provide centering, proved to be ungainly and unreliable. They quickly became the Achilles' heel of the system due to the combination of an overly complex mechanical design and a very low-cost internal flex circuit system. Another major flaw of the controllers was that the design did not translate into a linear acceleration from the center through the arc of the stick travel. The controllers did, however, include a pause button, a unique feature at the time. Various third-party replacement joysticks were also released, including those made by Wico.

Atari Inc. released the Pro-Line Trak-Ball controller for the system, which was used primarily for gaming titles such as Centipede and Missile Command. A paddle controller and an updated self-centering version of the original controller were also in development, but never made it to market.

Games were shipped with plastic card overlays that snapped in over the keypad. The card would indicate which game functions, such as changing the view or vehicle speed, were assigned to each key.

The primary controller was ranked the 10th worst video game controller by IGN editor Craig Harris. An editor for Next Generation said that their non-centering joysticks "rendered many games nearly unplayable".

Internal differences from 8-bit computers
David H. Ahl in 1983 described the Atari 5200 as "a 400 computer in disguise". Its internal design is a tweaked version of the Atari 8-bit family using the ANTIC, POKEY, and GTIA coprocessors. Software designed for one does not run on the other, but source code can be mechanically converted unless it uses computer-specific features. Antic magazine reported in 1984 that "the similarities grossly outweigh the differences, so that a 5200 program can be developed and almost entirely debugged [on an Atari 8-bit computer] before testing on a 5200". John J. Anderson of Creative Computing alluded to the incompatibility being intentional, caused by Atari's console division removing 8-bit compatibility to not lose control to the rival computer division.

Besides the 5200's lack of a keyboard, the differences are:
 The Atari computer 10 KB operating system is replaced with a simpler 2 KB version, of which 1 KB is the built-in character set.
 Some hardware registers, such as those of the GTIA and POKEY chips, are at different memory locations.
 The purpose of some registers is slightly different on the 5200.
 The 5200's analog joysticks appear as pairs of paddles to the hardware, which requires different input handling from the digital joystick input on the Atari computers

In 1987, Atari Corporation released the XE Game System console, which is a repackaged 65XE (from 1985) with a detachable keyboard that can run home computer titles directly, unlike the 5200. Anderson wrote in 1984 that Atari could have released a console compatible with computer software in 1981.

Reception

The Atari 5200 did not fare well commercially compared to its predecessor, the Atari 2600. While it touted superior graphics to the 2600 and Mattel's Intellivision, the system was initially incompatible with the 2600's expansive library of games, and some market analysts have speculated that this hurt its sales, especially since an Atari 2600 cartridge adapter had been released for the Intellivision II. (A revised two-port model was released in 1983, along with a game adapter that allowed gamers to play all 2600 games.) This lack of new games was due in part to a lack of funding, with Atari continuing to develop most of its games for the saturated 2600 market.

Many of the 5200's games appeared simply as updated versions of 2600 titles, which failed to excite consumers. Its pack-in game, Super Breakout, was criticized for not doing enough to demonstrate the system's capabilities. This gave the ColecoVision a significant advantage as its pack-in, Donkey Kong, delivered a more authentic arcade experience than any previous game cartridge. In its list of the top 25 game consoles of all time, IGN claimed that the main reason for the 5200's market failure was the technological superiority of its competitor, while other sources maintain that the two consoles are roughly equivalent in power.

The 5200 received much criticism for the "sloppy" design of its non-centering analog controllers. Anderson described the controllers as "absolutely atrocious".

David H. Ahl of Creative Computing Video & Arcade Games said in 1983 that the "Atari 5200 is, dare I say it, Atari's answer to Intellivision, Colecovision, and the Astrocade", describing the console as a "true mass market" version of the Atari 8-bit computers despite the software incompatibility. He criticized the joystick's imprecise control but said that "it is at least as good as many other controllers", and wondered why Super Breakout was the pack-in game when it did not use the 5200's improved graphics.

Technical specifications

 CPU: Custom MOS Technology 6502C @ 1.79 MHz (not a 65C02)
 Graphics chips: ANTIC and GTIA
 Support hardware: 3 custom VLSI chips
 Screen resolution: 14 modes: Six text modes (8×8, 4×8, and 8×10 character matrices supported), Eight graphics modes including 80 pixels per line (16 color), 160 pixels per line (4 color), 320 pixels per line (2 color), variable height and width up to overscan 384×240 pixels
 Color palette: 128 (16 hues, 8 luma) or 256 (16 hues, 16 luma)
 Colors on screen: 2 (320 pixels per line) to 16 (80 pixels per line). Up to 23 colors per line with player/missile and playfield priority control mixing.  Register values can be changed at every scanline using ANTIC display list interrupts, allowing up to 256 (16 hues, 16 luma) to be displayed at once, with up to 16 per scanline.
 Sprites: Four 8-pixel-wide sprites, four 2-pixel-wide sprites; height of each is either 128 or 256 pixels; 1 color per sprite
 Scrolling: Coarse and fine scrolling horizontally and vertically. (Horizontal coarse scroll 4, 8, or 16-pixel/color clock increments, and vertically by mode line height 2, 4, 8, or 16 scan lines.) (Or horizontal fine scroll 0 to 3, 7, or 15  single-pixel/color clock increments and then a 4, 8, or 16-pixel/color clock increment coarse scroll; and vertical fine scroll 0 to 1, 3, 7, or 15 scan line increments and then a 2, 4, 8, or 16 scan line increment coarse scroll)
 Sound: 4-channel PSG sound via POKEY sound chip, which also handles keyboard scanning, serial I/O, high resolution interrupt capable timers (single cycle accurate), and random number generation.
 RAM: 16 KB
 ROM:
 2 KB on-board BIOS for system startup and interrupt routing.
 32 KB ROM window for standard game cartridges, expandable using bank switching techniques.
 Dimensions: 13" × 15" × 4.25"

Popular culture
Critical to the plot of the 1984 film Cloak and Dagger is an Atari 5200 game cartridge called Cloak & Dagger. The arcade version appears in the movie; in actuality the Atari 5200 version was started but never completed. The game was under development with the title Agent X when the movie producers and Atari learned of each other's projects and decided to cooperate. This collaboration was part of a larger phenomenon, of films featuring video games as critical plot elements (as with Tron and The Last Starfighter) and of video game tie-ins to the same films (as with the Tron games for the Intellivision and other platforms).

Games

See also
 List of Atari 5200 emulators
 Video game crash of 1983

References

External links

 AtariAge – Comprehensive Atari 5200 database and information 
 Atari Museum 5200 Super System section 

5200
Home video game consoles
Second-generation video game consoles
Products introduced in 1982
65xx-based video game consoles